Newsrail is a monthly railway magazine covering the railways and tramways of Victoria, Australia. It was launched in January 1973 by the Australian Railway Historical Society's Victorian Division, superseding the Divisional Diary title that had been published by the society since November 1957. Since May 2020, it has been published by Victorian Rail Publishing Inc.

Details 
 Issue December 2019 is Vol 47 No. 12.
 Period = monthly
 Size = 245 mm (H) by 170 mm (W) (to Dec 1991), A4 (from Jan 1992)

References

External links
Official website

Magazines established in 1973
Magazines published in Melbourne
Monthly magazines published in Australia
Rail transport magazines published in Australia
1973 establishments in Australia